The Last Days of Oakland is the second album by American singer-songwriter Fantastic Negrito. Rayanne Pinna described the album as "an urgent, political record that grapples with the many changes Oakland has seen in recent years." In 2017, it won a Grammy Award for Best Contemporary Blues Album.

Track listing

Mixed By: Matt Winegar

Charts

References

2016 albums
Fantastic Negrito albums
Grammy Award for Best Contemporary Blues Album